David E. Newman is a professor in the physics department at the University of Alaska Fairbanks. He has a Ph.D. in plasma physics and conducts research on transport dynamics in fusion energy using numerical and complex systems models.

References

Living people
Place of birth missing (living people)
University of Alaska Fairbanks faculty
Year of birth missing (living people)
American nuclear physicists